is a former Japanese football player. She played for Japan national team.

Club career
Matsuda played for Prima Ham FC Kunoichi.

National team career
On June 15, 1997, Umeoka debuted for Japan national team against China. She played at 1997 AFC Championship. She played 4 games for Japan until 1998.

National team statistics

References

Year of birth missing (living people)
Living people
Japanese women's footballers
Japan women's international footballers
Women's association footballers not categorized by position